Stariki is a rural locality (a village) in Yugskoye Rural Settlement, Cherepovetsky District, Vologda Oblast, Russia. The population was 28 as of 2002.

Geography 
Stariki is located 56 km southeast of Cherepovets (the district's administrative centre) by road. Shalimovo is the nearest rural locality.

References 

Rural localities in Cherepovetsky District